Bollozzou Bassavalingam (బొల్లోజు బసవలింగం) was a poet, writer, independence activist from Yanam. He received Teluguratna (తెలుగురత్న) title from Government of Puducherry. He used Suvarna Sri (సువర్ణశ్రీ) as pen name for his works. During Yanam merger movement, he worked as president of French Indian Yuvajana Congress. As per instruction of fellow activist Dadala, he stayed at Yanam and worked to instigate the ideas of merger among Yanam populace and got incurred with some attacks from his opponents.

Life events 
He was born on July 10, 1934, at Yanam. In 1973, he obtained M.A. (Political Sciences) from Andhra University and in 1980 he obtained M.A. (French) from University of Karnataka. During 1990s for some time he was principal of Alliance française de Yanaon and taught French coursed. Later, he obtained Sri Akkineni Nageswararao award in the field of Drama. He died in 2004.

See also
 French India
 Yanam

References

1934 births
Telugu poets
Telugu writers
French Hindus
People from Yanam district
French India
People from Yanam
2004 deaths